Monument to Fyodor Ushakov — is a monument in Rostov-on-Don, Russia, dedicated to Russian admiral Fyodor Ushakov, the commander of the Black Sea Fleet, the commander of the Russian-Turkish squadron in the Mediterranean. The monument was opened on September 16, 2001.

History 
Russian admiral Fyodor Fedorovich Ushakov devoted his life to service in Russian Black Sea Fleet.

Monument description 
The monument is a bust of the admiral, mounted on a cylindrical granite pedestal. On the pedestal of the monument there is an inscription that reads: "Admiral Ushakov".

Literature 
(in Russian)
 Гурвич С. Гордость русского флота/ С. Гурвич// Молот.- 1974.- 29 июля.
 Дадашева Д. Будет у адмирала Ушакова свой ростовский постамент!/ Д. Дадашева// Вечерний Ростов.- 2001.- 7 авг.- С. 2.
 Клавдиев С. Здесь покоится прах адмирала Ушакова/ С. Клавдиев// Наше время.- 2002.- 15 февр.- С. 3.
 Последний причал адмирала Ушакова – Набережная Дона// Вечерний Ростов.- 2000.- 6 июня.
 Святой русский флотоводец// Наше время.- 2001.- 21 сент.- С. 3.
 Что Дону Ушаков? Что Дон Ушакову?// Наше время.- 2001.- 16 нояб.- С. 7.

External links 
 Monument to Fyodor Ushakov. Rostov-on-Don city.
 Monument to Fyodor Ushakov in Rostov-on-Don
 Monument to Fyodor Ushakov

2001 establishments in Russia
Sculptures in Russia
Busts in Russia
Monuments and memorials in Rostov-on-Don
Tourist attractions in Rostov-on-Don